Abraxas interpunctata is a species of moth belonging to the family Geometridae. It was described by Warren in 1905. It is known from Sula Island.

References

Abraxini
Moths of Asia
Moths described in 1905